The Trade Desk (stylized as theTradeDesk) is an American multinational technology company that specializes in real-time programmatic marketing automation technologies, products, and services, designed to personalize digital content delivery to users.

The Trade Desk is headquartered in Ventura, California. It is the largest independent demand-side platform in the world, competing against DoubleClick by Google, Facebook Ads, and others. Unlike traditional marketing, programmatic marketing is operated by real-time, split-second decisions based on user identity, device information, and other data points. It enables highly personalized consumer experiences, and improves return-on-investment for companies and advertisers. Demand-side platforms, like The Trade Desk, work with ad exchanges to deliver such tailored digital experiences.

The company continued to grow since its founding in 2009. As of 2021, it offers a self-service publishing platform for brands & advertisers, a data management platform for advanced analytics & segmentation, and enterprise APIs that enable advanced integrations. It has over 225 partners worldwide, and is responsible for delivering personalized content on Spotify and more.

The Trade Desk has been recognized for its omni-channel approach to programmatic marketing automation, with strong data analytics capabilities, fast response-times, and support for various connected devices, online platforms, and media formats.

The firm currently employs around 2,800 people in 25 office locations worldwide. It was ranked among the 100 Best Medium Workplaces by Fortune in 2018, and have been continually named in the list since then.

History

Early years 
The Trade Desk was co-founded in 2009 by Jeff Green and David Pickles. They met at Microsoft after it had acquired Green's real-time digital advertising auction firm, AdECN, in 2007. By 2012, the company was included as an alpha partner in Facebook’s launch of the real-time bidding (RTB) advertising platform, Facebook Exchange.

In 2015, The Trade Desk was named among the top 10 of America’s Most Promising Companies by Forbes. Founders Green and Pickles were also named as Ernst & Young Entrepreneurs of The Year 2015 in the Greater Los Angeles region.

Initial public offering 
On September 21, 2016, The Trade Desk became a public company with an initial $18 price target. The company's opening day was reported as a "vote of confidence for the demand-side platform, whose S1 filing revealed healthy financials: Triple digit revenue growth and profitability — rare in a sector that is seeing much of its growth chomped away by the duopoly Google and Facebook." The company continued to experience tremendous growth, and reached a market cap of US$40 billion by 2021.

Post-IPO growth 
In 2017, The Trade Desk integrated connected TV buying and measurement directly into its platform; acquired marketing insights firm AdBrain; and partnered with fraud prevention firm White Ops to block fraudulent ad traffic prior to purchase. The firm also improved transparency in programmatic buying by enabling buyers to see all selling or reselling parties to a bid request.

In 2018, the firm began investing heavily into the Asia Pacific region with the launch of its programmatic ad buying platform in China, giving access to Chinese media companies, such as Alibaba, Tencent and Baidu Exchange Services. It also launched new AI tools: an AI forecasting engine named Koa, a new user interface, new tools for mapping strategies called The Trade Desk Planner, and a proprietary global user identity resolution tool called Unified ID.

In 2019, Amazon opened connected TV (CTV) Apps integrated with Amazon Publisher Services, enabling the purchase of ad inventory for third-party TV content provider The Trade Desk, through Amazon Fire TV devices.

In September 2019, The Trade Desk launched an advertising campaign, “Media for Humankind,”  to position itself as a “more transparent digital advertising” alternative to Google and Facebook.

Company affairs

Financials 
The Trade Desk raised $2.5 million of venture capital in March, 2010. Investors included venture capital firms Founder Collective and IA Ventures, and angel investors Jerry Neumann and Josh Stylman.

The Trade Desk went public on September 21, 2016, with an initial stock price of $18.00; its IPO closing market price gained to $30.10 per share.

In 2017, revenue rose 52 percent to $308 million, which rose to $477 million in 2018. In 2019, third-quarter revenue was reported as $164 million, attributed to the growth of connected TV advertising. The Trade Desk finished 2019 with a record total spend on the platform of $3.1 billion.

On June 17, 2021, the company completed its 10–1 stock split, with a trading price of $68.

See also
List of advertising technology companies

References

External links

Marketing companies established in 2009
Online advertising services and affiliate networks
Companies based in Ventura County, California
Companies listed on the Nasdaq
2016 initial public offerings
Online advertising
Digital marketing companies of the United States
2009 establishments in California